1908 Szentlőrinci AC KSE is a Hungarian football club from the town of Pestszentlőrinc, Budapest.

History
Szentlőrinci Atlétikai Club debuted in the 1945–46 season of the Hungarian League and finished eighth.

Name Changes 
1908–1919: Pestszentlőrinci Athletikai Club
1919–1945: Szentlőrinci Atlétikai Club
1945–1947: Szentlőrinci AC Barátság
1947: merger with Kőbányai Barátság 
1947–1949: Szentlőrinci Atlétikai Club
1949: merger with Budapesti Postás SE
1956: reestablished  
1957–1959: Petőfi Szentlőrinci Atlétikai Club

Famous footballers
 Ferenc Deák: the fourth top goalscorer of all time in football history.

Managers
 László Fenyvesi (1945–46)

External links
 Profile

References

Football clubs in Hungary
1909 establishments in Hungary